Lemm is a surname. Notable people with the surname include:

Heinz-Georg Lemm (1919–1994), German soldier
Oscar Lemm (1856–1918), Russian Egyptologist and Coptologist
Romano Lemm (born 1984), Swiss ice hockey player
Vanessa Lemm, Australian philosopher and academic
Wally Lemm (1919–1988), American football coach